JS Ōryū (SS-511) is the eleventh boat of Sōryū-class submarines. She was commissioned on 5 March 2020.

Construction and career
Ōryū was laid down at Mitsubishi Heavy Industries Kobe Shipyard on November 16, 2015, as the 2015 plan 2900 ton type submarine No. 8126 based on the medium-term defense capability development plan (23 medium-term defense), and October 2018 It was named and launched on the 4th of March, and the delivery ceremony and the self-defense ship flag awarding ceremony were held on 5 March 2020, and it was commissioned. It was incorporated into the 1st Submarine Flotilla and deployed at Kure Naval Base.

The Ōryū bears the distinction of being the first submarine launched with Lithium-ion batteries, which replaced the AIP Stirling engine system used in the other boats of the Sōryū-class submarines.

Gallery

Citations

References
『世界の艦船 増刊第66集 海上自衛隊全艦艇史』（海人社、2004年）

External links

2018 ships
Sōryū-class submarines
Ships built by Kawasaki Heavy Industries